The Denver Open, also known as the Denver WCT or by its sponsored name United Bank Tennis Classic, is a defunct WCT and Grand Prix affiliated men's tennis tournament played from 1972 to 1982. It was held in Denver, Colorado in the United States and played on indoor carpet courts. The loss of the main sponsor led to the cancellation of the tournament after the 1982 edition.

Jimmy Connors was the most successful player at the tournament, winning the singles competition three times.

Finals

Singles

Doubles

1972 doubles results not included on ATP website

See also
 Virginia Slims of Denver – women's tournament

References

External links
 ATP results archive

Carpet court tennis tournaments
Indoor tennis tournaments
Defunct tennis tournaments in the United States
World Championship Tennis
Grand Prix tennis circuit